Nathanael Ming-Yan Wei, Baron Wei (born 19 January 1977), also known as Nat Wei, is an English social entrepreneur with an interest in social reform. He is the first British-born person of Hong Kong origin to have become a member of the House of Lords, sitting as a Conservative, and was the youngest member of the House from 2010 to 2016. He was also previously an adviser to the UK Government on their Big Society project.

Lord Wei is the founding partner of the Shaftesbury Partnership, the founder of Maker Life, a member of the founding team of Teach First
and a former adviser at Absolute Return For Kids. 
He is also a former fellow of the Young Foundation. and World Economic Forum Young Global Leader. Lord Wei had also served as the Chairman of the Conservative Friends of the Chinese, but stepped down in August 2020.

Early life
Lord Wei is the son of Hong Kong parents with paternal ethnic roots in Zhongshan. Wei's father was a pastor who moved to Britain in the 1970s. He was born in Watford and grew up in Milton Keynes and Tooting, London.

Education
Lord Wei was educated at the Sir Frank Markham Community School, a state comprehensive school in Milton Keynes (since closed, and replaced by the Milton Keynes Academy on the same site), where some of the pupils snorted cocaine and even burned down a wing of the school, and bullied him for taking his studies seriously. However, in a later account of his school life, Wei appeared to contradict this account, stating that as he 'got good grades, but was also sporty', he was never targeted or bullied. The only pupil from his school year to attend the University of Oxford, he studied Modern Languages at Jesus College. He has a working knowledge of Cantonese, French and German.

Life and career
After graduating from Jesus College, Oxford, Wei worked at McKinsey & Company for three years, where he came to know Brett Wigdortz, who founded Teach First in 2002. In 2006, after three years at Teach First and a short stint in social venture capital, Wei joined the children's charity Absolute Return for Kids (ARK) where he helped to set up Future Leaders, a programme seeking to attract, develop and place high-potential teachers and future leaders of urban schools.

Founding the Shaftesbury Partnership
Around the same time as helping to set up Future Leaders, in early 2006, Wei founded the Shaftesbury Partnership, an organisation which seeks to emulate the great social reformers of the Victorian era by creating scalable social reforms. The Shaftesbury Partnership are currently working on a number of projects around housing, unemployment and healthcare. Through the Shaftesbury Partnership, Wei co-founded The Challenge Network, 
an independent charity which exists to "inspire and connect people to strengthen their community".  The Challenge Network runs a two-month civic service programme called The Challenge which has attracted strong interest from both government and opposition.

In 2011, the Shaftesbury Partnership working with Johnson & Johnson and Queens Nursing Institute and Buckinghamshire New University piloted NurseFirst – a clinicians in the community development programme to produce a network of innovators who can create real change for patients, people and communities. In 2013, a report on the pilot, 2 years on, concluded that first cohort of clinicians showed quantitative and qualitative improvements in their confidence, their leadership skills, their ability to innovate and their ability to make clinical innovation happen. They produced financially sustainable business plans for £1.2 million of cash releasing savings over 3 years. The programme is now being scaled up.

Social reform 
On 18 May 2010 at the launch of the New Coalition Government policies on Big Society to a group of community leaders, Lord Wei was appointed as an unpaid Government Adviser on Big Society. He was based at the Office for Civil Society in the Cabinet Office where he worked one day a week, and advised the Government on all aspects of taking forward the Big Society and driving implementation across government.
At the launch event, the Prime Minister, David Cameron, announced that Wei would also be appointed a life peer. He was introduced in the House of Lords on 3 June 2010 as Baron Wei, of Shoreditch in the London Borough of Hackney. He is the third person of Chinese ethnic origin to become a member of the House of Lords, after Baroness Dunn (who is not domiciled in the UK) and the late Lord Chan; the third person of Hong Kong ancestry to become a House of Lords member, after Baroness Dunn and the late Lord Kadoorie; and the first-ever member of Chinese origin to be British-born. He is also one of the youngest people to have been made a life peer, at the age of 33.

Due to his role as Government Advisor Lord Wei stepped down from any direct, formal involvement in the organisations he had previously been involved with. On 24 May 2011, Lord Wei announced his decision to step down from his role as Government Advisor on Big Society to help as a volunteer to drive the practical development of Big Society ideas in communities. The Prime Minister, David Cameron said 'Nat has worked incredibly hard over two years to help develop policies that support the Big Society. He has played an important role in delivering key initiatives like Community Organisers, National Citizen Service, and the Big Society Bank." Previously, Lord Wei had also cited personal financial difficulties that he had suffered as a result of the demands of his part-time position.

Chinese heritage 
Lord Wei's ancestry can be traced back to a village in Zhuhai, on the southern coast of Canton (now Guangdong). His ancestral home is two villages away from that of Sun Yat-sen, the founding father of the Republic of China, about whom incidentally, Wei enjoys reading and learning.

As the only current ethnic Chinese peer in The House of Lords, and the first member of Chinese ethnic origin to have been born and brought up in the UK, Lord Wei takes an interest in British Chinese community issues, particularly in social reform. He is also interested in economic and cultural ties between the UK and China.

His focus in working with East Asia comprises now of work within the Conservative Party to help engage ethnic East Asian voters and help them gain the voice, representation and participation that they need as Britain's third largest minority group.

Up to July 2015, he worked in Parliament through the All Party Parliamentary Group APPG for East Asian Business which he chaired, the All Party Parliamentary China Group of which he was the vice-Chair (special focus on Hong Kong), and the All Party Parliamentary Group for Trade and Investment of which he was treasurer to promote better trade and political and cultural links between the UK and East Asia and work to encourage the next generation of East Asians and other diaspora to develop the leadership skills to play a greater role in public life, in society, and business, and in harnessing the resources that East Asians have globally and locally both financial and non-financial to address global and local problems today. The All Party Parliamentary Group for East Asian Business was discontinued after the May 2015 election.

In 2012, Manchester local government commissioned Lord Wei to write a report on how Manchester can best engage with China. Following that Report, a Manchester-China Forum was established which hosts regular activities to help member businesses share information and knowledge, including seminars, meet-the-buyer events, and other networking opportunities. Lord Wei continues to work as a non-executive director of the Forum.

Other 
In 2013, Lord Wei was invited to become a World Economic Forum Young Global Leader.

In 2015, Lord Wei became a member of the House of Lords EU Internal Affairs Sub-Committee. He stepped down from this Committee in June 2018.

Personal life
Lord Wei is a Christian. He is married to Cynthia Wei and has two sons.

See also
 European politicians of Chinese descent

References

1977 births
Living people
People from Watford
Alumni of Jesus College, Oxford
British political consultants
British management consultants
Social entrepreneurs
British people of Hong Kong descent
English people of Hong Kong descent
Conservative Party (UK) life peers
Life peers created by Elizabeth II
British politicians of Chinese descent